The Elizavetpol Governorate, also known after 1918 as the Ganja Governorate, was a province (guberniya) of the Caucasus Viceroyalty of the Russian Empire, with its capital in Yelisavetpol (present-day Ganja). The area of the governorate stretched  and was composed of 1,275,131 inhabitants in 1916. The Elizavetpol Governorate bordered the Erivan Governorate to the west, the Tiflis Governorate and Zakatal Okrug to the north, the Dagestan Oblast to the northeast, the Baku Governorate to the east, and Iran to the south.

Geography 
The area of the governorate includes the southern slope of the main Caucasus range in the northeast, where Mount Bazardüzü and other peaks rise above the snow-line; the arid steppes beside the Kura river, reaching 1000 ft. of altitude in the west and sinking to 100–200 ft. in the east, where irrigation is necessary; and the northern slopes of the Transcaucasian escarpment and portions of the Armenian Highlands, which is intersected towards its western boundary, near Lake Sevan, by chains of mountains consisting of trachytes and various crystalline rocks.

Elsewhere the country has the character of a plateau, 7,000 to 8,000 ft. high, deeply trenched by tributaries of the Aras. All varieties of climate are found in the snowclad peaks, Alpine meadows, and stony deserts of the high levels, to that of the hill slopes and of the arid Caspian steppes.

History 
Elizavetpol Governorate was created by the decree "On the transformation of the administration of the Caucasian and Transcaucasian region" dated December 9, 1867. The province included the Elizavetpol uezd of the Tiflis Governorate, the Nukha and Shusha uezds of the Baku Governorate and part of the abolished Ordubad uezd. By the same decree, the Kazakh and Zangezur uezds were formed as part of the province. In 1873, three new uezds were formed in the Governorate - Aresh, Jebrail and Jevanshir. The governorate included lands of the former Ganja Khanate, Shaki Khanate, and Karabakh Khanate. It bordered with Baku Governorate, Tiflis Governorate, Erivan Governorate, Dagestan Oblast, and Persia.

From 1905, there were attempts by Armenian intelligentsia of the Russian Empire to separate the highland areas (commonly known as Mountainous Karabakh) from the rest of Elizavetpol into a zemstvo (self-governing rural community) province. 

On the establishment of the Azerbaijan Democratic Republic in May 1918, the Elizavetpol Governorate was renamed Ganja Governorate to de-Russify the region. The neighboring Democratic Republic of Armenia claimed the entirety of the western highland sections of the governorate which as a whole formed a small Armenian majority, however, Armenian control did not exceed the western parts of Zangezur, Kazakh and Karabakh. In 1919, the entirety of Karabakh south of the Murov Range with British support was separated into the Karabakh General Governorship, following the subjugation of the Karabakh Armenian Council.

The governorate provincial system was abolished in the early 1920s after the Sovietization of Azerbaijan. In early 1921—after the Sovietization of Armenia—a Dashnak Armenian revolt that spawned in Yerevan spread to the Zangezur uezd, becoming known as the Republic of Mountainous Armenia. The rebels led by Garegin Nzhdeh finally departed Zangezur in the summer of 1921 after receiving guarantees the district would remain part of Soviet Armenia.

In the present-day, the territory of the former Elizavetpol Governorate forms the bulk of western Azerbaijan and adjacent areas of northeastern and southeastern Armenia.

Administrative divisions 
The counties (uezds) of the Elizavetpol Governorate in 1917 were as follows:

Demographics
The 1886 population estimate was 728,943, living in 3 cities (Elizavetpol, Nukha, and Shusha) and 1521 villages. According to 1886 statistics reported in Brockhaus and Efron Encyclopedic Dictionary, the Orthodox Christians constituted 0.21% of the Governorate's population, and various sektanty ("sectarians") around 1% (~7,300 people). This means that most of the ethnic Russians in the governorate at the time (1.11% of the Governorate's 728,943 population in 1886) were members of various sectarian communities such as Doukhobors and Molokans.

Russian Empire Census 
The majority of the population indicated Tatar to be their mother tongue, with a significant Armenian speaking minority.

Kavkazskiy kalendar 

Known governors
Fokion Bulatov, 1868–1876
Alexander Nakashidze, 1880–1897
Ivan Kireyev, 1897–1900
Nikolai Lutsau, 1900–1905
Yegor Baranovsky, 1905 (acting)
Alexander Kalachev, 1905–1907
Samkalov, 1907–1908
Georgi Kovalev, 1908–1916
Mikhail Poyarkov, 1916–1917

Notes

References

Bibliography 

 
Caucasus Viceroyalty (1801–1917)
Governorates of the Caucasus
Modern history of Azerbaijan
Modern history of Armenia
States and territories established in 1868
States and territories disestablished in 1917
1868 establishments in the Russian Empire
1917 disestablishments in Russia
19th century in Azerbaijan
20th century in Azerbaijan